SMS Gazelle was an  screw-driven frigate of the Prussian Navy built in the 1850s. The ship was laid down in 1855 at the Royal Dockyard in Danzig, launched on 19 December 1859, completed on 22 May 1861, and commissioned into the Navy almost a year later on 15 May 1862.

She served on overseas duties for the majority of her career, in 1864 she sailed to Japan.  On 8 January 1884, when she was stricken from the naval register. She was used as a barracks ship in Wilhelmshaven thereafter, until she was sold for scrap in 1906 for 36,000 gold marks and broken up.

Footnotes

References
 

 

1859 ships
Ships built in Danzig
Arcona-class frigates